Phu Wiang Dinosaur Museum is a geological museum mainly exhibiting fossils. It is under the administration of the Department of Mineral Resources, Ministry of Natural Resources and Environment, of the Royal Thai Government, and situated in the Khok Sanambin public area in Tambon Nai Muang, Wiang Kao district, Khon Kaen province in the northeastern region of Thailand. It has been open to the public since 2009.

Background 

Dinosaur fossils were first discovered in Thailand during mineral exploration in the Phu Wiang area of Khon Kaen province. In 1976 Sudham Yaemniyom, a geologist, discovered a piece of bone on a streambed, Huai Pratu Tima, which was later identified as a distal part of the left femur of a sauropod dinosaur, regarded as the first dinosaur discovery of Thailand.

Since 1976, the Department of Mineral Resources, together with the Thai-French Paleontological Project, investigated the dinosaurs in the Phu Wiang mountains. The project found many vertebrae, teeth, and dinosaur footprints mainly from sandstone of the Early Cretaceous Sao Khua Formation (about 130 million years old), including sauropod and theropod, with a wide range of sizes, from a hen up to a large dinosaur with about 15 meters long. These finds led Thai people to visit the dinosaur sites, and Princess Maha Chakri Sirindhorn visited Site 2 on 3 November 1989. She also revisited the site, viewing Site 3 and the Phu Wiang Dinosaur Museum, with the committees of the Prince Mahidol International Award, of the Prince Mahidol Award Foundation, on 25 October 2008.

Site development 
After Phu Wiang National Park was established in 1991, the Khon Kaen province and Phu Wiang district administrations, the Tourism Authority of Thailand, Department of Mineral Resources, and other government agencies recognized the importance of the dinosaur sites in the national park. Consequently, the Tourism Authority was allocated a budget to develop four dinosaur sites, namely Site 1, Site 2, Site 3, and Site 9, by constructing small buildings covering the sites to protect the dinosaur bones from disturbances, together with walking trails connecting the sites.

Museum origin 
Discovery of the dinosaurs on the Phu Wiang mountains, especially the sauropod dinosaur Phuwiangosaurus sirindhornae, named after Princess Maha Chakri Sirindhorn, was regarded as important and raised awareness of the Phu Wiang mountains. The Department of Mineral Resources was delegated to look after and administer the site by establishing a permanent exhibition and opening it to the public in 2001.

Museum composition 
The Phu Wiang Dinosaur Museum houses activities including a research and investigation section, fossil replication and conservation, a fossil collection house, library, permanent exhibition, administration office, and service space such as a canteen, souvenir shop, snack and drinks shop, car parking space, and a 140-person capacity auditorium. The Phu Wiang Dinosaur Museum is a geological learning source for pupils and students from many educational institutes and other agencies, including educational promotion foundations.

Dinosaurs from Phu Wiang 
 Phuwiangosaurus sirindhornae
 Siamosaurus suteethorni
 Siamotyrannus isanensis
 Kinnareemimus khonkaenensis

Accessibility 

The word "Phu Wiang" in the name of the museum results from the fact that the museum used to be located in the Phu Wiang District, though since 2006 it is located in the newly established Wiang Kao district. It is about 80 kilometers to the west of the province capital Khon Kaen.

References 

Dinosaur museums
Natural history museums in Thailand
Buildings and structures in Khon Kaen province
Tourist attractions in Khon Kaen province
Museums established in 2001
2001 establishments in Thailand
Paleontology in Thailand